Zangi Bon (also Romanized as Zangī Bon; also known as Zangīn Bon and Zangīn) is a village in Kashkan Rural District, Shahivand District, Dowreh County, Lorestan Province, Iran. At the 2006 census, its population was 32, in seven families.

References 

Towns and villages in Dowreh County